Selenkay is an upcoming Argentinian mystery-fantasy streaming television series for children and adolescents, which is produced by Metrovisión Producciones for the Walt Disney Company. In Latin America, the eight-part first season of the series is expected to be released in 2023 on Disney+.

Plot  
16-year-old Sofía Rivera had to move constantly because of her parents' work and live in the most remote places. Sofía longs for stability in life and finally wants to build long-term friendships and relationships. This wish seems to come true when the family moves to the small mountain village of Río Vivo. But when Sofía discovers a supernatural power that is connected to water, her dreams vanish into thin air. At the same time, the controversial and mysterious Fénix siblings arrive in the village and attract the attention of all residents, including Sofías. Sofía quickly develops a deep connection with Gael, the middle brother, to whom Sofía feels drawn. Her family is against this relationship because they don't trust Gael and his siblings. As Sofía deepens her relationship with Gael, she begins to decipher all mysterious and supernatural events and learns more about herself in the process. Her discoveries ultimately lead Sofía to question her previous understanding of the world.

Cast 
 Gina Mastronicola as Sofía Rivera
 Manuel Ramos as Gael Fénix
 Mónica Antonópulos as Aurora
 Carolina Kopelioff as Emilia
 Alejandro Paker as Pedro Rivera 
 María Zubiri as Iris Rivera
 Julián Caballero as Lupo Rivera 
 Luisina Arito as Flox Rivera 
 Valentín Villafañe as Rafael Fénix
 Francisco Vázquez as Micael Fénix
 Nahuel Pirovano as Tacu Adek
 Thais Rippel as Diana Alves
 Charo Bogarín as Navera Adek
 Joaquín Berthold as Patrick Robinson
 Gustavo Masó as Intendente Frank
 Mario Alarcón as Lucio
 Lucía Tuero as Vicky

Episodes

References

External links 
 

Argentine fantasy television series
2020s mystery television series
Television shows filmed in Argentina
Spanish-language television shows
Disney+ original programming
Upcoming television series